Knud Lange (born 9 May 1984 in Bremerhaven) is a German rower.

Lange study on the University of Bremen. He rowing for the Bremerhavener Ruderverein in Lightweight rowing Quad scull for Germany. He wins some World championship-Medals:
 WC 2006, Dorney Lake by Eton (UK): Silver-Medal with Kai Anspach, Martin Rückbrodt, Knud Lange, Christoph Schregel.
 WC 2007, Olympia-Oberschleißheim Regatta Course by Munich: Place four
 WC 2008, in Linz/Ottensheim: Bronze-Medal with Stephan Schad, Knud Lange, Felix Övermann and Michael Wieler.
 WC 2009, on the Malta lake in Poznań in Poland: Silver-Medal with Knud Lange, Lars Wichert, Felix Övermann and Michael Wieler.

He wins 2011 the Gold-Medal by the Students European Rowing Championships 2011 in Moscow.

He was Bremen Sportspersonality of the Year in 2006, 2007 and 2008.

References 
 

1984 births
Living people
German male rowers
Sportspeople from Bremerhaven
World Rowing Championships medalists for Germany